Iphimeis is a genus of leaf beetles in the subfamily Eumolpinae. It is known from South America.

Species
 Iphimeis balyi Harold, 1874
 Iphimeis dives (Germar, 1824)
 Iphimeis dubitabilis Bechyné, 1950
 Iphimeis dubitabilis corumbae Bechyné, 1950
 Iphimeis dubitabilis dubitabilis Bechyné, 1950
 Iphimeis finalis Bechyné, 1950
 Iphimeis fulva Lefèvre, 1876
 Iphimeis fulvipes Baly, 1864
 Iphimeis fuscitarsis Lefèvre, 1884
 Iphimeis itataiensis Bechyné, 1953
 Iphimeis nicki Bechyné, 1953
 Iphimeis nigritarsis (Lefèvre, 1878)

Synonyms:
 Iphimeis deposita Bechyné, 1952: moved to Taimbezinhia
 Iphimeis erythropus Lefèvre, 1876: moved to Coytiera
 Iphimeis rugicollis Lefèvre, 1875: synonym of Iphimeis dives (Germar, 1824)
 Iphimeis speciosa Weise, 1921: moved to Chalcoplacis

References

Eumolpinae
Chrysomelidae genera
Beetles of South America
Taxa named by Joseph Sugar Baly